The Global Guardians is a team of DC Comics superheroes whose members hail from countries around the world. The concept originated in the Super Friends Saturday morning cartoon, which aired after the comics stories in Super Friends #7-9, in which several heroes (Black Vulcan, Samurai, Apache Chief and El Dorado) were added to the Justice League to give it more ethnic diversity.

Fictional team history
The characters that would form the Global Guardians first appeared in the Super Friends comic book series. They were first introduced in a story (in Super Friends #7-9) in which an alien villain called Grax (an old Superman foe) planted bombs on Earth's seven continents to destroy it. Thanks to a warning from the Wonder Twins (in their first comic book appearance) the Justice League discovered the plan in time and recruited the heroes of the countries affected to find the bombs before they exploded.

These international heroes would later appear in other issues of Super Friends. However, it wasn't until DC Comics Presents #46 (June 1982) that they were introduced as a team, in a story in which they helped Superman to stop an evil Atlantean sorcerer named Thaumar Dhai. This is also considered to be these characters' first canonical appearance in the DC Universe.

After Crisis on Infinite Earths, it was revealed that the Global Guardians had been gathered together by Doctor Mist to serve as the enforcing arm of an international organization called "The Dome", which had been created by the Treaty of Rome in 1957 to help organize the efforts of superheroes across the globe as an international police organization.

Prior to that, in the early 1950s, several international heroes who had been the beneficiaries of the Justice Society of America's kindness during and after World War II, had banded together in an informal "Club of Heroes". They were integrated in the Global Guardians after its foundation. (Batman's butler Alfred Pennyworth sends Christmas cards to the currently surviving members).

This original Global Guardians were based in a United Nations-financed headquarters building also called the Dome located in Paris. The original team was also funded by Doctor Mist and administrated by a woman called Belphegor who was gifted with psychic powers. Many of the Guardians individually assisted other international heroes during the Crisis on Infinite Earths crossover and once teamed up with Infinity, Inc.

The Guardians eventually lost their UN funding to the Justice League, and the Dome was ordered to close, in part due to the political machinations of their enemy, Dr. Klaus Cornelius. Some of its members left the team to join the League, notably Green Fury and Icemaiden (who changed their names to Fire and Ice). The others went freelance.

Part of the team was brainwashed by the Queen Bee of Bialya and were directed to battle the Justice League. Fain Y'onia, an ancient foe of their leader, Doctor Mist, caused the deaths of Bushmaster and Thunderlord and depowered others. The surviving Guardians would continue to meet in the Dome's Headquarters, which was formerly located in Europe but is now in the Pacific.

In a story in the JLA Classified series, some of the Guardians were seen to have joined the Ultramarine Corps.

In 2006, as part of the events of One Year Later, in Green Lantern (vol. 4) #10, the Global Guardians are shown regrouped, apparently led by former New Guardian Jet. They attempt to recruit the newest Crimson Fox. When she declines, they say she has no choice. Crimson Fox is later seen publicly voicing the opinions of the Guardians, among them a hatred for Hal Jordan. It is eventually revealed that they are being telepathically controlled by the Faceless Hunter in his attempts to capture Green Lantern. They are defeated and freed from the alien's control.

In World War III, in 52 week 50, the Global Guardians assist the Marvel Family in an attack on Black Adam but were all easily and brutally defeated by the enraged villain.

In the 2009 Justice League: Cry for Justice series, it was revealed that members of the Global Guardians had been targeted and/or killed by Prometheus, including Tasmanian Devil, Gloss, Sandstorm, and Freedom Beast.

In the Watchmen sequel Doomsday Clock, a news report states that Wonder Woman is in talks to reestablish the defunct Global Guardians.

Members

The Club of Heroes

 The first Knight of England was followed by his son, the second Knight.
 The second Squire of England was followed by his daughter, the third Squire.
 The Gaucho of Argentina inspired the Argentinian hero team Super Malon.
 The Musketeer of France.
 The Wingman of Sweden.
 The Legionary of Italy.
 Man-Of-Bats  of Sioux Nation
 Little Raven of Sioux Nation
 The Ranger of Australia

Global Guardians

Founding members
 Seraph (Chaim Lavon of Israel): A Jewish school teacher who was granted biblical powers. He helped Superman dismantle a bomb in Israel and free the Wonder Twins after they were brainwashed. He had a few missions as a solo fighter. As a Global Guardian, he helped Superman retrieve an ancient artifact. He remained on the team for a few years, but declined an offering from the Queen Bee of Bialya, since he was Jewish and Bialya was a Muslim state. For a while, Seraph fought solo, trying to think of ways to revive the Global Guardians. Finally, Doctor Mist called him to Bialya to rescue the Global Guardians. The mission was successful. After a battle with Doctor Mist's enemy Fain Y'onia, Seraph helped Rising Sun, Owlwoman, and Olympian create the New Global Guardians, placing himself as leader.
 Bushmaster (Bernal Rojas of Venezuela): A herpetologist who invented gadgets that mimic the abilities of reptiles, past and present. He helped Batman and Robin dismantle a bomb in Venezuela and capture a villain. Along with other Global Guardians, he was brainwashed by the Queen Bee of Bialya. Once he snapped out of it, he returned to the Global Guardians, but was killed by Fain Y'onia.
 Olympian (Aristides Demetrios of Greece): A hefty Greek punk who wears the Golden Fleece, which grants him the powers and abilities of the 50 men and women who sailed on the Argo to find the Golden Fleece. He helped Wonder Woman battle Colonel Conquest in Greece, where a bomb was supposed to be hidden. Later on, he helped Superman twice. The Greek hero later met Fury of Infinity Inc. When he heard his fellow members were to be supported by the Bialyan dictator Queen Bee, Olympian joined up. After the Queen Bee died, a successor arrested him for schizophrenia. He later reunited with the other Global Guardians and remained a member since, even after a battle with Fain Y'onia. He was romantically attracted to Godiva. He was seen amongst the Ultramarines alongside Jack O'Lantern and Kid Impala. His most recent appearance was in the Wonder Girl mini-series as the guardian of Cassandra Sandsmark and her mother Helena, a position appointed to him by Zeus. There is a second Oympian called Olympia - a female with Amazon level super strength - Greek as well, both defend Greece and are Global Guardians.
 Jack O'Lantern (Daniel Cormac of Ireland): A poor farmer who was granted a magic lantern by an Irish fairy. His first recorded mission was to help Green Lantern dismantle a bomb in Ireland. He also helped Superman find an ancient ruin in Ireland. He helped heroes from Ireland and England save the world in the Crisis on Infinite Earths. While the Justice League became the world's greatest heroes, Jack left the Global Guardians and joined Rumaan Harjavti's army in Bialya. After Harjavti was killed by the Queen Bee of Bialya, Jack voluntarily joined forces with the villainess in taking over the world. He was left dying in a sewer after a battle with the Justice League. However, he was found alive by his girlfriend Owlwoman and the two heroes found Doctor Mist. They took a major part in reuniting the Global Guardians. Afterwards, Jack died of natural causes. The second Jack O'Lantern was actually a man named Marvin Nirosa from Bialya. He was killed by Owlwoman after she learned the truth. The third Jack was Daniel Cormac's cousin Liam McHugh. McHugh became a member of the now disbanded Primal Force, and is currently a member of the Ultramarine Corps.
 Impala (M'Bulaze of South Africa): A Zulu warrior who was politically minded. He helped the Flash dismantle a bomb in South Africa, and joined forces with other African heroes in the Crisis on Infinite Earths. He, along with other Global Guardians, was brainwashed by the Queen Bee of Bialya. After coming to his senses and being rescued by other former Global Guardians, Impala lost his powers to Fain Y'onia, and he later died at Roulette's house of games. His successor, Kid Impala joined the Ultramarines.
In the latest comics, Impala is back with the Global Guardians and teamed up with Vixen who had an instant attraction to this handsome super hero. He seems to also have a Totem linked super power to some African deity granting him incredible speed and healing ability. Vixen asked him out.
 The Little Mermaid (Ulla Paske of Denmark): A teenage hero born from a legged man from Poseidonis and a mermaid from Tritonis. Her first mission was to help Aquaman dismantle a bomb in Atlantis. Later on, she helped Aquaman defeat Sinestro and Superman find an ancient ruin. She took part in helping the Atlantean heroes in the Crisis on Infinite Earths. Later on, she was one of many Global Guardians brainwashed by the Queen Bee of Bialya, she seemingly died in battle with the Justice League. She later resurfaced, claiming that the woman killed in combat had been an evil clone created by the Queen Bee after Ulla had escaped captivity. She, or perhaps a successor, was later seen as a member of the Ultramarine Corps.
 Doctor Mist (Nommo of Kor, Africa): An ancient African sorcerer who served as the leader of the Global Guardians. He lived for 11,000 years and formed an older incarnation of the team. A robotic clone was created when at one time in the past he disappeared. Later on, he was found by Jack O'Lantern and Owlwoman alive in a dungeon. With his help, the heroes reunited with the Global Guardians. An eternal, Mist's physical body was supposedly slain by an ancient occult force. Nonetheless, he did turn up alive and seemingly well after the Zero Hour. At this time he formed a new team of heroes known as Primal Force. He was killed after being thrown into a pool of acid by the evil Mordru.
 Tasmanian Devil (Hugh Dawkins of Australia): A former engineer and drama coach who was cursed by a tasmanian devil. He helped Green Arrow dismantle a bomb in Australia and fought a mind-controlled Robin, who was protesting to Australian youths. After the disbanding of the Global Guardians, Tasmanian Devil helped found the Justice League International embassy in Australia. He learned his fellow Global Guardians were brainwashed by the Queen Bee and he wanted to help reform the group. He later joined Doctor Mist, Jack O'Lantern, Owlwoman, Rising Sun, and Seraph in retrieving the Global Guardians. Afterwards, Tasmanian Devil returned to the Justice League. Later, he had a brief stint as a member of the Ultramarine Corps. He has recently joined the newest incarnation of the Global Guardians. He was later skinned by the villain Prometheus, but was restored by a Lazarus Pit. One of the few openly gay superheroes, he is dating Starman Mikaal Tomas.
 Rising Sun (Izumi Yasunari of Japan): A Japanese solar physicist who is a founding member of Big Science Action, and a longtime member of the Global Guardians. His first known mission was to help Atom dismantle a bomb in Japan. He later helped Robin defeat a villain and Superman find a piece of ancient armor. He helped save Japan in the Crisis on Infinite Earths, and helped Artemis save her parents Huntress and Sportsmaster with the help of Infinity Inc. The Japanese hero volunteered to help the Queen Bee battle the Justice League in Germany. He fell into a coma for a while. As soon as he woke up, he returned to active duty with the Global Guardians. After a few battles with his teammates, Izumi secretly betrayed them and helped fellow Japanese hero Doctor Light battle a horde of Bialyan soldiers. Afterwards, he found Doctor Mist, Jack O'Lantern, and Owlwoman together and he helped the three heroes reform the Global Guardians. During the battle with Fain Y'onia, Rising Sun was one of the few Global Guardians to survive and he helped re-establish the Global Guardians.
 Owlwoman (Wenonah Littlebird of Oklahoma, United States): A Native American from Oklahoma of the Cherokee tribe. She was first seen helping Hawkman and his wife Hawkwoman dismantle a bomb in the darkness of an Oklahoma field. She also took part in the Crisis on Infinite Earths. After her boyfriend Jack O'Lantern left the Global Guardians, Owlwoman went to Bialya and joined the Queen Bee's army. The two ex-Global Guardians helped the Queen Bee take over the world. Jack O'Lantern and Owlwoman helped the Queen Bee brainwash the other Global Guardians into serving her. In a battle with the Justice League, Owlwoman betrayed her teammates and killed an impostor Jack O'Lantern. She found the real Jack O'Lantern alive in a dungeon, as well as Doctor Mist. The three heroes later reunited the Global Guardians. After a battle with Doctor Mist's old foe, Fain Y'onia, Owlwoman was one of the few remaining Global Guardians to survive and reformed the Global Guardians.
 Thunderlord (Liang Xih-k'ai of Taiwan): A Buddhist monk who uses his voice like a sound wave. He helped the Black Canary dismantle a bomb on the island of Taiwan. Later on, he assisted the brothers Thunder and Lightning in Vietnam during the Crisis on Infinite Earths. Thunderlord joined the other Global Guardians as pawns of the Queen Bee. Like most of the Guardians, he assisted the Justice League Europe in battling a robot threat. It took a trip into the sewers before the group could destroy it. Unknown to the heroes, the robot was under the Queen's control and she did not care if it had actually killed Thunderlord or anyone else in particular, as it was a public relations maneuver. Like the other brainwashed victims, Thunderlord remained loyal to the Queen Bee until her murder by Sumaan Harjavti. At the same time, several recently-fired members of the Justice League—Blue Beetle, Captain Atom, Elongated Man and the Crimson Fox—had violated international law to investigate Bialya. They correctly suspected Bialya was behind their firings and other manipulations of the League. The group confronted the Guardians and in the crossfire, Little Mermaid was slain by a blast from Jack O'Lantern. Thunderlord and the rest of the Guardians pursued the League through the Queen's scientific facilities and discovered the brainwashing center. 
In another mission, Thunderlord, the Guardians and the Justice League teamed up to defeat the mind-controlling villain Sonar. The heroes involved stayed to help the injured, then went their separate ways. Thunderlord gained a job doing celebrity impersonations. Fain Y'onia, an ancient enemy of Doctor Mist, began attacking the group one by one. Godiva, Impala and the Olympian were all injured and Bushmaster died during his fight with Fain. The surviving Guardians gathered again, ambushing Fain in the Arizona desert when he tried to kill Owlwoman. Fain's energy blasts pierced Thunderlord, killing him. After Fain's defeat, a statue was built to honor Thunderlord and placed alongside statues of other fallen Guardians. 
Thunderlord made a cameo along with many of his Guardian allies in The OMAC Project. In that storyline, multiple heroes raced to destroy a sentient satellite that detested all powered beings.
 Tuatara (Jeremy Wakefield of New Zealand): A youthful hero who can predict the future with the help of a third eye. His first mission was to help the Red Tornado dismantle a bomb into the Prehistoric Era. He also helped the Super Friends fight a time menace. A few years later, Tuatara was brainwashed, along with Rising Sun and Wild Huntsman, into serving the Queen Bee of Bialya. In a battle with the Justice League in England, Tuatara slipped into a coma. He was later restored and brought back to action. His last known mission was the battle of Fain Y'onia, where he suffered brain damage. He is now in a coma and is tended by his teammate, the Seraph.
 Godiva (Dorcas Leigh of England): A beautiful English socialite whose power resided in the manipulation of her hair. She had a romantic relationship with Aristides Demetrios. Her first mission was to safeguard the people living and working near London from a bomb, a mission in which she assisted the Elongated Man. Her greatest foe proved to be the Queen Bee, then dictator of Bialya, who successfully brainwashed the heroine along with other heroes. It appeared that Godiva lost her powers after a battle with Fain Y'onia, and that she had since retired from action. After the Infinite Crisis she was seen in a S.T.A.R. Labs hospital, the victim of organ-napping - the body part in question being her hair. In DC's New 52 continuity, she was a member of the Justice League International.
 Wild Huntsman (Albrecht von Mannheim of Germany): A re-incarnation of a German warrior, who is allied by a horse (Orkan) and a hound (Donnerschlag). His first known mission was helping the Wonder Twins find a villain. He was later brainwashed by the Queen Bee of Bialya and with his allies Rising Sun and Tuatara, he fought the Justice League and slipped into a coma, along with horse and canine. He later woke up and rejoined his teammates. A few years later, he disappeared in battle with Fain Y'onia. Whether the Huntsman was dead or alive was initially unknown. Years later his corpse turned up in Belle Reve in the pages of John Ostrander's Suicide Squad. His body mysteriously appeared within one of the prison cells, prompting the Belle Reve-based Suicide Squad to participate in the War of the Gods storyline. A second Wild Huntsman made an appearance in Red Robin #3.
 Fire (formerly Green Fury and Green Flame) (Beatriz da Costa of Brazil): As a Global Guardian, Green Fury fought Superman in her native Brazil. She later helped the Super Friends on several missions. When an old foe of Doctor Mist lost his armor, Green Fury helped Superman retrieve the armor. She later changed her name to Green Flame and worked on a case with Infinity Inc. before joining the Justice League. Fire is now a member of the UN sponsored organization Checkmate.
 Glacier (Sigrid Nansen of Norway): As a Global Guardian, Glacier (Formerly known as Icemaiden) helped the whole Justice League of America dismantle a bomb in Antarctica. Before they joined the Justice League, they worked on a case with Infinity Inc. Glacier is also one of the few bisexual heroes in the DCU. Glacier is also one of the few nonbinary heroes in the DCU. They quit the Guardians shortly after a second Icemaiden (who had true magical ice powers) joined the team. They later joined the Justice League after the second Icemaiden (then renamed Ice) died in battle. Following the events of One Year Later Sigrid was seen in a forced hibernative state brought about by having had their skin flayed off by metahuman organ thieves. Their current status is unknown.

Later members
 Cascade of Indonesia
 Centrix of Canada
 Gloss of China
 Chrysalis of France (actually a living bomb)
 Fleur-de-Lis (Noelle Avril of France): Fleur-de-Lis was shown fighting Dr. Klaus Cornelius in the 1980s Blue Beetle series; after the closure of the Dome, she went freelance and once helped Deathstroke and Andre Chavard's Department Gamma of French Intelligence.
 Icemaiden II (Tora Olafstotter of Norway): a princess of an isolated tribe of magic-wielding Norsemen, Icemaiden II had the natural ability to create and manipulate ice. She joined the Global Guardians, and soon afterwards the original Icemaiden quit (due to her lack of self-confidence since she had scientifically received her powers, whereas Tora was a real icemaiden). She later joined the Justice League and changed her name to Ice.  She had a romantic liaison with Guy Gardner, before dying battling the Overmaster. Ice returned to life in the 2007 Birds of Prey title. She is now living in New York, apparently trying to recover from the shock of being dead for so long.
 Templar Knight (Simon Lesur) of France: In Teen Titans Spotlight #11, Belphegor mentions this deceased former member, of whom nothing more is known.
 Tundra of Russia: Enhanced strength and cold projection abilities.

These characters (with the exception of Icemaiden II) had rare appearances in DC continuity after their first appearance, but Cascade had a cameo shot in the Villains United Infinite Crisis Special. She also appeared later in 52 as a member of Black Adam's coalition.

Two other characters were associated with the Global Guardians but were not actual members:
 Belphegor of France, who appeared to function mostly as an assistant to Dr. Mist; she has vanished since the closure of the Dome.
 Red Star (Leonid Kovar of Russia)

Pre-Flashpoint
 Crimson Fox of France
 Jet of Jamaica
 Manticore of Greece.
 Sandstorm of Syria (possibly deceased)
 Tasmanian Devil of Australia

Related sources
Cadre of the Immortal is a group of international heroes operating in the DC Comics Universe. The Cadre is home to five Super Friends/Super Powers Collection doppelgangers: Black Vulcan (Mohammed Ibn Bornu), Apache Chief (Seneca), Samurai (Musashi), El Dorado (Xiuhtecutli) and Golden Pharaoh (Osiris).

References

External links
 Global Guardians at DC Wiki
 Global Guardians at Comic Vine
 Global Guardians  at Cosmic Teams
 Club of Heroes at Cosmic Teams

DC Comics superhero teams
Comics characters introduced in 1982
DC Comics metahumans
DC Comics male superheroes
DC Comics female superheroes
DC Comics superheroes
African superheroes
American superheroes
Asian superheroes
European superheroes
Latin American superheroes